Mujīr ad-Dīn ʿAbd al-Dawla Abu Saʿīd Ābaq ibn Jamāl ad-Dīn Muhammad (died 1169) was the Arab governor of Damascus from 1140 to 1154. He was the eldest son of Jamal ad-Din Muhammad and the last Burid ruler of the Emirate of Damascus.

Name
His honorific title "Mujīr ad-Dīn" means "protector of the faith".

Life
After the death of his father in 1140, Mujir ad-Din succeeded his father as governor in 1140. As he was still a minor, Mu'in ad-Din Unur was named vizier. Zengi attacked Damascus, hoping to take advantage of Jamal ad-Din's death, but Mu'in ad-Din effectively organized the defense of the city. When this regent died in July 1149, Mujir ad-Din took his place as the rightful heir of Damascus. He was a weak ruler, however, and Damascus came under the influence of Nur ad-Din Zangi, emir of Aleppo and Mosul, who had imposed his dominance over the city in the aftermath of the Second Crusade. 

In 1150, Nur ad-Din recognized Mujir ad-Din as ruler of Damascus, but in 1151 Mujir ad-Din allied with the crusaders against Bosra, angering Nur ad-Din. Later that year Mujir ad-Din visited Aleppo and swore to remain loyal to Nur ad-Din. In 1152, Mujir ad-Din again besieged Bosra, until the governor of the city agreed to his demands and he returned to Damascus. In 1153, Mujir ad-Din joined Nur ad-Din in his attempt to capture of the crusader castle at Banias. In 1154, the two were in conflict again, and Nur ad-Din finally occupied Damascus by force, exiling Mujir ad-Din to Homs. Nur ad-Din was fully in control of the city and all of Syria. Mujir ad-Din later left Homs for Baghdad.

Sources

12th-century births
1169 deaths
Medieval child monarchs
Burid rulers
Seljuk dynasty
Turkic rulers
Muslims of the Second Crusade
12th-century rulers in Asia